Česká Metuje is a municipality and village in Náchod District in the Hradec Králové Region of the Czech Republic. It has about 300 inhabitants. The village of Skalka, part of Česká Metuje, has well preserved folk architecture and is protected by law as a village monument zone.

Administrative parts
Villages of Skalka and Vlásenka are administrative parts of Česká Metuje.

Notable people
Franz Bruno Hofmann (1869–1926), Austrian physiologist

References

Villages in Náchod District